Baron Grantley, of Markenfield, in the County of York is a title in the Peerage of Great Britain. It was created on 9 April 1782 for Sir Fletcher Norton, Attorney General from 1763 to 1765 and Speaker of the House of Commons from 1770 to 1780. His son, the second Baron, was also a politician and represented Richmond, Wigtown Burghs, Guildford and Surrey in Parliament. He was succeeded by his nephew, Fletcher Norton, the third Baron. He was childless and on his death the title passed to his nephew, the fourth Baron.
  the title is held by the latter's great-great-grandson, the eighth Baron, who succeeded his father in 1995.

Barons Grantley (1782)

Fletcher Norton, 1st Baron Grantley (1716–1789)
William Norton, 2nd Baron Grantley (1742–1822). Son of 1st Baron.
Fletcher Norton, 3rd Baron Grantley (1796–1875). Grandson of 1st Baron, nephew of 2nd Baron. His brothers were Charles Francis Norton and George Chapple Norton.
Thomas Brinsley Norton, 4th Baron Grantley (1831–1877). Nephew of 3rd Baron, great-grandson of 1st Baron.
John Richard Brinsley Norton, 5th Baron Grantley (1855–1943). Son of the 4th Baron.
Richard Henry Brinsley Norton, 6th Baron Grantley (1892–1954). Son of the 5th Baron.
John Richard Brinsley Norton, 7th Baron Grantley (1923–1995). Son of the 6th Baron. 
Richard William Brinsley Norton, 8th Baron Grantley (b. 1956). Son of the 7th Baron.

The heir presumptive is the present holder's brother, Francis John Hilary Norton (b. 1960).
The heir presumptive's heir apparent, and last in line to the peerage, is his only son John Ferenc Brinsley Norton (b. 2005)

Arms

See also
Grantley Hall

References

Bibliography

External links

Lord Grantley
Baron Grantley

Baronies in the Peerage of Great Britain
Infobox template
Grantley
Noble titles created in 1782